Monstera costarisensis is a flowering plant in the genus Monstera and family Araceae.

Distribution 
It is native to Costa Rica.

References 

costaricensis